The 3rd European Badminton Championships were held in Karlskrona (Sweden), between 14 and 16 April 1972, and hosted by the European Badminton Union and the Svenska Badmintonförbundet.

Medalists

Results

Semi-finals

Finals

Medal account

References
Results at BE

European Badminton Championships
European Badminton Championships
B
B
Badminton tournaments in Sweden
April 1972 sports events in Europe
Sports competitions in Karlskrona